Agrupación Deportiva Las Palas was a Spanish football team based in Las Palas, in the autonomous community of Murcia; its home games were held at the Estadio El Arenal, with a capacity of 4,000.

History
It was founded in 1982 and dissolved in 2008.

Seasons

15 seasons in Tercera División

References

Association football clubs established in 1982
Association football clubs disestablished in 2008
Defunct football clubs in the Region of Murcia
1982 establishments in Spain
2008 disestablishments in Spain